Istomikha is a rural locality (a village) in Azletskoye Rural Settlement, Kharovsky District, Vologda Oblast, Russia. The population was 17 as of 2002.

Geography 
Istomikha is located 53 km northwest of Kharovsk (the district's administrative centre) by road. Kogarikha is the nearest rural locality.

References 

Rural localities in Kharovsky District